Texas Cyclone is a 1932 American Pre-Code Western film directed by D. Ross Lederman for Columbia Pictures. The film stars Tim McCoy as "Texas Grant", Shirley Grey, Wheeler Oakman and John Wayne, and features an early appearance by Walter Brennan as the sheriff.

Plot
"Texas" Grant rides into a strange town only to find that everyone there recognizes him, but not as Texas Grant. The town villains confuse him with a lawman named Jim Rawlings whom they had murdered a few years prior, because the two men look very similar. Hefty the bartender and Sheriff Collins used to be friends with Rawlings and come up with a plan to fool the local crooks into thinking Grant really is the man they killed. Even Helen, the dead lawman's widow, thinks her husband has returned from the grave when she first sees him.

Grant sees how the woman's ranch hands are mismanaging the ranch her husband left her and are even stealing from her, and decides to help her get the place back to financial solvency. Appointing himself the new boss and adopting the identity of Jim Rawlings, he fires all but one of the ranch hands, an honest young man named Steve Pickett, and together Grant and Pickett try to help the widow rebuild her enterprise.

Cast
Tim McCoy as "Texas" Grant 
Shirley Grey as Helen Rawlings 
Wheeler Oakman as Utah Becker 
John Wayne as Steve Pickett 
Wallace MacDonald as Nick Lawler, Ranch Foreman 
James Farley as Webb Oliver  
Walter Brennan as  Sheriff Lew Collins
Dick Dickinson as Knife Thrower (uncredited)

See also
 John Wayne filmography
 List of American films of 1932

External links
 

1932 films
American black-and-white films
1930s English-language films
Columbia Pictures films
1932 Western (genre) films
American Western (genre) films
Films directed by D. Ross Lederman
1930s American films